The MYX Magna Award is a special award presented annually by Myx. It was first awarded at the first Myx Music Awards in 2006; Sharon Cuneta won the award, and it is given in honor of a music icon with an exemplary contribution in the Philippine music industry.

Special Award winners

Gallery of recipients

Notes

References

External links
 MYX Music Awards official website

Myx Music Awards